Agios Amvrosios is the name of two settlements in Cyprus:

Agios Amvrosios, Kyrenia, a town east of Kyrenia
Agios Amvrosios, Limassol, a small village northwest of Limassol